Pan-Euungulata ("all true ungulates") is a clade of placental mammals from grandorder Ferungulata, consisting of the mirorder Euungulata and extinct family Protungulatidae.

Classification and phylogeny

Classification
 Clade: Pan-Euungulata 
 Mirorder: Euungulata  (true ungulates)
 Clade: Mesaxonia 
 Clade: Paraxonia 
 Family: †Protungulatidae

Phylogenetic tree
The phylogenetic relationships of Pan-Euungulata are shown in the following cladogram:

See also
 Mammal classification
 Ferungulata

References

 
Mammal unranked clades